Residents for Guildford and Villages are a political party based in Guildford. The party was formed in early 2019 to contest the 2019 Guildford Borough Council election, and is the second largest party on the Guildford Borough Council, after winning 15 seats out of 48.

The party campaigns for changes to the Local Plan and on environmental issues.

Electoral history

Guildford Borough Council elections
In 2019, R4GV contested the Guildford Borough Council elections, standing 17 candidates and winning 15 seats. R4GV also unsuccessfully contested the Friary and St Nicolas by-election and the Pirbright by-election to the borough council as part of the 2021 local elections, and unsuccessfully contested the 2022 Tillingbourne by-election to the borough council.

Surrey County Council elections
In the 2021 Surrey County Council elections R4GV stood in six of the ten county seats within Guildford borough and won two of them.

References

External links
 

Guildford
Political parties established in 2019
Locally based political parties in England
2019 establishments in England